Orgreave Colliery was a coal mine situated adjacent to the main line of the Manchester, Sheffield & Lincolnshire Railway
The colliery is within the parish of Orgreave, from which it takes its name.

History 
The opening, by the Sorby family, of Dore House Colliery in 1820 saw the beginning of coal mining in the area around Orgreave. The first shaft of Orgreave Colliery itself being sunk in 1851.

Just over a mile east in the Rother Valley below the village of Fence a colliery was commenced in 1842. This colliery was bought and the Fence Colliery Company founded in 1862. In 1870 this company acquired Orgreave from the Sorby family and in 1875 its Directors leased land in the area from the Duke of Norfolk. In the same year the Fence Colliery Company was renamed Rother Vale Collieries Limited, owning Orgreave and Fence collieries, later sinking a new colliery at Treeton. Fence colliery was connected underground to Orgreave from 1887 and coal was drawn there from 1904. 
 
Following the First World War Orgreave was acquired by the United Steel Companies who used the coal obtained to supply the new Orgreave Coking and By Products plant. Metallurgical coke was supplied from here to United Steel’s blast furnace plant at Scunthorpe. From 1922 coke oven gas was supplied to the Sheffield Gas Company, this continuing until the advent of gas from below the North Sea.

At nationalisation the mining and coking operations were split, the coal processing and chemicals interests stayed with United Steel Companies under their subsidiary, the United Coke & Chemical Company. The collieries at Orgreave and Treeton were linked underground and as well as the coking plant the coal drawn by these collieries was fed to the washery at Orgreave Coal Preparation Plant. Orgreave colliery closed in October 1981, the coking ovens in 1990.

In 1995, British Coal Opencast gained permission to restore the tip, which reputedly contained over 12 million tonnes of spoil, and make the land fit for rebuilding. This work included the recovery of coal, from the tip and sub-surface, by opencasting. On 30 November 2005, the last coal was removed from the Orgreave site, bringing an end to an era which began over 170 years before.

The River Rother, dubbed one of the country’s most polluted, was re-routed over a stretch of almost ¾ mile and, in conjunction with the closure of the Coalite and Chemicals plant at Bolsover, cleaned – up. The area is now rich in wildlife.

Redevelopment
 of the reclaimed site is now the Advanced Manufacturing Park, home to research and manufacturing organisations such as the Advanced Manufacturing Research Centre with Boeing, Castings Technology International and TWI's Yorkshire Technology Centre.

A further 741 acres (300 ha) is now being developed to form the new Waverley Community. When complete the development will include residential (4000 homes), office and commercial areas.

Rail connections 
The Manchester, Sheffield & Lincolnshire Railway's (MS&LR) "Extension to London Act" not only contained details of the new main line but also five branch lines to serve collieries on the route, with one exception, that to Orgreave Colliery which was to be served from the MS&LR line about one mile (1.6 km) west of Woodhouse. In fact this was to become the only branch to be built. It left the main line, where exchange sidings were located, opposite Orgreaves Colliery signal box, and ran through to a halt at the colliery at the bottom of a 1 in 27 incline.

The Orgreave Paddy Mail 
The colliery was served, at shift change times by workmen's trains, known as Paddy mails, which ran between Sheffield Victoria and Orgreave Colliery. One of these trains was involved in an accident on the morning of 13 December 1926.

The train service was withdrawn in May 1932 when the River Rother flooded and washed away parts of the three bridges which crossed it. All traffic was severed and a replacement bus service was introduced in place of the Paddy mail which never returned. Sheffield Corporation began operating a regular service of "Pit Buses" along the main routes from the city centre.

Rolling stock 
The Rothervale Collieries locomotives could be found working at Orgreave, Treeton and Thurcroft Collieries and were transferred as necessary. All the locomotives listed below, except those shown as being scrapped or being owned by United Coke and Chemicals, became the property of the National Coal Board on nationalisation.

Footnotes

References

Sources
East of Sheffield, by Roger Milnes, "Forward", Journal of the Great Central Railway Society, No.16, March 1978. .
(This article also uses unpublished research material not used in "East of Sheffield" provided by members of the Woodhouse Local History Group, local members of the Great Central Railway Society and others).

Coal mines in Rotherham
Coal mines in South Yorkshire
Underground mines in England